"Sorry" is a song by American hip hop recording artist Rick Ross, featuring vocals from American singer Chris Brown. This was released on October 9, 2015, as the first single from his  eighth studio album Black Market. The song was produced by Scott Storch.

Music video
On November 12, 2015 Ross uploaded the music video for "Sorry" on his YouTube and Vevo account.

Live performances
On December 7, 2015, Ross and Brown performed the song live on the Jimmy Kimmel Live!.

Charts

Certifications

References

2015 singles
2015 songs
Chris Brown songs
Rick Ross songs
Song recordings produced by Scott Storch
Songs written by Chris Brown
Songs written by Rick Ross
Songs written by Scott Storch